Thomas Wallace (13 April 1765 – 9 January 1847) was an Irish Whig Party politician who sat in the House of Commons of the United Kingdom as a Member of Parliament (MP) for Yarmouth from 1827 to 1830, from 1831 to 1835 for  Drogheda and then for County Carlow.

Wallace was a Dublin barrister. He stood unsuccessfully at Drogheda at the general elections in 1818, 1820, 1826 before being elected as a Tory for Yarmouth at a by-election in August 1827. He held the Yarmouth seat until the 1830 general election, when he did not defend the seat. He contested Drogheda again in 1831, before winning the seat at an unopposed by-election in October 1831.

At the 1832 general election he was elected as one of the two MPs for County Carlow, and held the seat until he retired from the Commons at the 1835 general election.

Wallace died at the age of 81.

References

External links 

1765 births
1847 deaths
Whig (British political party) MPs for Irish constituencies
UK MPs 1826–1830
Members of the Parliament of the United Kingdom for County Carlow constituencies (1801–1922)
Members of the Parliament of the United Kingdom for County Louth constituencies (1801–1922)
UK MPs 1831–1832
UK MPs 1832–1835